Tokyo's 11th district is a electoral district of the House of Representatives, the lower house of Japan's National Diet. The district was established in 1994 as part of the move to single-member districts, and since its first election 1996 it has only been held by the Liberal Democratic Party's Hakubun Shimomura.

Areas Covered

Current District 
As of 18 January 2023, the areas covered by this district are as follows:

 Parts of Itabashi
 Parts of the Central Ward jurisdiction 
 Itabashi 1-4, Kaga 1-2, Oyama Higashi, Oyamakanai, Kumano, Nakamaru, Minami, Inaridai, Nakajuku, Hikawa, Sakae, Oyama, Oyama Nishi, Saiwai, Nakaitabashi, Naka, Yayoi, Hon, Yamato, Futaba, Fujimi, Otaniguchi Kami, Otaniguchi Kita, Otaniguchi 1/2, Mukaihara 1-3, Komone 1-5, Tokiwadai 1-4,Minami Tokiwadai 1/2, Higashishin 1/2, Kamiitabashi 1-3, Shimizu, Hasunuma, Ohara, Izumi, Miyamoto, Shimura 1-3, Sakashita 1 1-26/28, Higashisakashita 1, Azusawa 1-4, Nishidai 1, Nishidai 2 (excluding 30-5-16 and 31-40), Nishidai 3 (excluding 47-55-57), Nishidai 4, Nakadai 1-3, Wakaki 1-3, Maeno 1-6, Misono 2, Higashiyama, Sakuragawa 1-3
 Parts of the former village of Akatsuka 
 Nishidai 2 (30-5-16, 31-40) and 3 (47, 55, 57), Tokumaru 1-8, Yotsuba 1-2, Daimon, Akatsuka 1-8, Akatsuka Shin 1-3, Narimasu 1-5, Misono 1

Areas from 2017-2022 
From the first redistricting

 Parts of Itabashi
 Parts of the central ward jurisdiction 
 Itabashi 1-4, Kaga 1-2, Oyama Higashi, Oyama Kanai, Kumano, Nakamura, Minami, Tokyo, Inaridai, Nakajuku, Hikawa, Sakae, Oyama, Oyama Nishi, Saiwai, Nakaitabashi, Naka, Yayoi, Hon, Yamato, Futaba, Fujimi, Otaniguchi Kami, Otaniguchi Kita, Otaniguchi 1/2, Mukaihara 1-3, Komone 1-5, Tokiwadai 1-4, Minami Tokiwadai 1/2, Higashishin 1/2, Kamiitabashi 1-3, Shimizu, Hasunuma, Ohara, Izumi, Miyamoto, Shimura 1-3, Sakashita 1 (1-26, 28), Higashisakashita 1, Azusawa 1-4, Nishidai 1, Nishidai 2 (excluding 30-5-16 and 31-40), Nishidai 3 (excluding 47-55-57), Nishidai 4, Nakadai 1-3, Wakaki 1-3, Maeno 1-6, Misono 2, Higashiyama, Sakuragawa 1-3, Takashimadaira 1-9, Shingashi 3

Areas from before 2017

Elected Representatives

Election Results 
‡ - Also ran in the Tokyo PR district

‡‡ - Also ran and won in the Tokyo PR district

Elections in the 2020s

Elections in the 2010s 

{{Election box begin|title=2012<ref>

Elections in the 2000s 
{{Election box begin|title=2009<ref>

{{Election box begin|title=2005<ref>

{{Election box begin|title=2003<ref>

{{Election box begin|title=2000<ref>

Elections in the 1990s 
{{Election box begin|title=1996<ref>

References 

1994 establishments in Japan
Constituencies established in 1994
Districts of the House of Representatives (Japan)
Politics of Tokyo